Ebru Kavaklıoğlu (born Yelena Kopytova on 14 March 1970 in the Russian SFSR) is a retired long-distance runner who specialized mainly in the 5000 metres.

She initially represented Russia, but became a Turkish citizen by marriage in 1999, changing her name at the same time. She was member of the Fenerbahçe Athletics Club.

Achievements

Personal bests
1500 metres - 4:08.45 min (1999)
5000 metres - 14:51.69 min (1999)

External links

1970 births
Living people
Russian female long-distance runners
Fenerbahçe athletes
Naturalized citizens of Turkey
Turkish people of Russian descent
Athletes (track and field) at the 1992 Summer Olympics
Athletes (track and field) at the 2000 Summer Olympics
Athletes (track and field) at the 2004 Summer Olympics
Olympic athletes of the Unified Team
Olympic athletes of Turkey
Turkish female long-distance runners
Russian emigrants to Turkey
Mediterranean Games gold medalists for Turkey
Mediterranean Games bronze medalists for Turkey
Mediterranean Games medalists in athletics
Athletes (track and field) at the 2001 Mediterranean Games